Doremus is a surname. Notable people with the surname include:

Benoît Dorémus (born 1980), French singer-songwriter
David Doremus (born 1957), American television actor
Frank Ellsworth Doremus (1865–1947), politician
Henry Meade Doremus, Mayor of Newark, New Jersey
John Doremus (1931–1995), American radio personality
Sarah Platt Doremus (1802–1877), New York City philanthropist
Robert Ogden Doremus (1824–1906), United States chemist and physician, son of Sarah Platt Doremus
Charles Avery Doremus (1851–1925), United States chemist, son of Robert Ogden Doremus
Louis Doremus Huntoon (1869–1937), American mining engineer
Drake Doremus (born 1983), American film director and screen writer
Estelle Skidmore Doremus (1830-1905), New York City philanthropist

See also
Doremus & Co., advertising agency